Dr. Ibrahim Didi is a politician from the Maldives.

Political career
Prior to entering politics, Didi worked as a dentist. He is also the former President of Maldivian Democratic Party (MDP) and left to join the Jumhooree Party. He later rejoined the MDP.

He was Minister of Fisheries And Agriculture of the Maldives between 2008 and 2012. He became the Minister on 11 November 2008 until resigning after rejection by parliament on 10 December 2010. He was then re-appointed on 19 July 2011. He was born on September 18th 1966.

References

Year of birth missing (living people)
Living people
People from Addu City
Government ministers of the Maldives
Maldivian Muslims